The De Anza League was a California High School sports league in San Bernardino County, California and Riverside County, California and was disbanded at the end of 2017-2018 high school sports season. Most teams joined the Desert Valley League while Rancho Mirage high school joined the newly formed Desert Empire League. It was part of the CIF Southern Section.

The seven teams in the league were:

 Coachella Valley High School - Arabs
 Desert Hot Springs High School - Golden Eagles
 Desert Mirage High School - Rams
 Rancho Mirage High School - Rattlers
 Twentynine Palms High School - Wildcats
 Yucca Valley High School - Trojans

References

CIF Southern Section leagues
Sports in San Bernardino County, California
Twentynine Palms, California
Yucca Valley, California